National Road 12 (abbreviated as EO12) is a single carriageway road in northern Greece. It connects Thessaloniki with Kavala, passing through Serres and Drama. It also serves traffic heading towards the north, to the Greek/Bulgarian border. The section between Thessaloniki and Serres forms part of the Ε79 route. Part of the GR-12 has been replaced by the new motorway 25 (Thessaloniki - Serres) and the Egnatia Odos.

Route

The GR-12 runs north from downtown Thessaloniki as an urban arterial road called "odos Lagkada". This section is common with the GR-2. Near Efkarpia it joins with the A2 motorway and follows this to the northeast until Liti. It continues to the northeast, more or less parallel to the A25. It passes through Lachanas and crosses the river Strymonas at Strymoniko. It bypasses Serres, and runs east through Nea Zichni and to Drama. At Drama it turns southeast.  The road ends in Kavala.

The GR-12 passes through the following towns and cities, ordered from west to east:

Thessaloniki
Liti
Lachanas
Strymoniko
Serres (bypass)
Nea Zichni
Alistrati
Drama
Krinides
Kavala

History

The highway was first paved in the 1920s and the 1930s, although it was not fully paved up until the 1950s. Between the 1990s and 2004, the southern and the northern sections were upgraded to a motorway, while the full length of the road up to Serres is expected to be upgraded into a motorway too in 2012.

12
Roads in Central Macedonia
Roads in Eastern Macedonia and Thrace